These species belong to Stenomorpha, a genus of darkling beetles in the family Tenebrionidae.

Stenomorpha species

 Stenomorpha abbreviata (Casey, 1912)
 Stenomorpha abstrusa (Casey, 1912)
 Stenomorpha acerba (Horn, 1878)
 Stenomorpha advena (Casey, 1912)
 Stenomorpha amplicollis (Casey, 1912)
 Stenomorpha angulata (LeConte, 1851)
 Stenomorpha baroni (Casey, 1912)
 Stenomorpha blanda (Champion, 1884)
 Stenomorpha blapsoides Solier, 1836
 Stenomorpha brevimargo (Casey, 1912)
 Stenomorpha californica (Motschulsky, 1870)
 Stenomorpha caliginosa (Casey, 1912)
 Stenomorpha captiosa (Horn, 1870)
 Stenomorpha catalinae (Blaisdell, 1933)
 Stenomorpha clarissae Wilke, 1922
 Stenomorpha clathrata (Champion, 1884)
 Stenomorpha cochisensis (Casey, 1912)
 Stenomorpha coenosa (Casey, 1912)
 Stenomorpha collaris (Champion, 1892)
 Stenomorpha collega (Casey, 1912)
 Stenomorpha compressa (Horn, 1870)
 Stenomorpha confluens (LeConte, 1851)
 Stenomorpha congruens (Casey, 1912)
 Stenomorpha consentanea (Casey, 1912)
 Stenomorpha consobrina (Horn, 1870)
 Stenomorpha consors (Casey, 1912)
 Stenomorpha consueta (Casey, 1912)
 Stenomorpha convexa (LeConte, 1859)
 Stenomorpha convexicollis (LeConte, 1854)
 Stenomorpha corrugans (Casey, 1912)
 Stenomorpha costata Solier, 1836
 Stenomorpha crassa (Casey, 1912)
 Stenomorpha cressoni (Blaisdell, 1933)
 Stenomorpha cribrata (Casey, 1912)
 Stenomorpha crinita (Casey, 1912)
 Stenomorpha deceptor (Casey, 1912)
 Stenomorpha difficilis (Champion, 1884)
 Stenomorpha directa (Casey, 1912)
 Stenomorpha divaricata (Blaisdell, 1923)
 Stenomorpha dolosa (Casey, 1912)
 Stenomorpha durangoensis (Casey, 1912)
 Stenomorpha embaphionides (Horn, 1894)
 Stenomorpha evanescens (Casey, 1912)
 Stenomorpha evertissima (Casey, 1912)
 Stenomorpha eximia (Casey, 1912)
 Stenomorpha facilis (Casey, 1912)
 Stenomorpha fastigiosa (Casey, 1912)
 Stenomorpha flohri (Champion, 1892)
 Stenomorpha foeda (Champion, 1892)
 Stenomorpha forreri (Champion, 1884)
 Stenomorpha funesta (Champion, 1884)
 Stenomorpha furcata (Champion, 1892)
 Stenomorpha gabbii (Horn, 1880)
 Stenomorpha geminata (Champion, 1892)
 Stenomorpha globicollis (Casey, 1912)
 Stenomorpha gracilior (Casey, 1912)
 Stenomorpha gracilipes (Casey, 1912)
 Stenomorpha granicollis (Blaisdell, 1923)
 Stenomorpha gravidipes (Casey, 1912)
 Stenomorpha hirsuta (LeConte, 1851)
 Stenomorpha hispidula (LeConte, 1851)
 Stenomorpha horrida (Champion, 1892)
 Stenomorpha huachucae (Casey, 1912)
 Stenomorpha humeralis (Triplehorn & Flores, 2002)
 Stenomorpha idahoensis (Boddy, 1957)
 Stenomorpha ignava (Casey, 1912)
 Stenomorpha immunda (Casey, 1912)
 Stenomorpha impetrata (Horn, 1894)
 Stenomorpha implicans (Casey, 1912)
 Stenomorpha impotens (Casey, 1912)
 Stenomorpha inhabilis (Casey, 1912)
 Stenomorpha integra (Casey, 1912)
 Stenomorpha lata (Champion, 1884)
 Stenomorpha latissima (Champion, 1892)
 Stenomorpha lecontei (Horn, 1866)
 Stenomorpha lecontella (Blaisdell, 1936)
 Stenomorpha luctata (Horn, 1870)
 Stenomorpha lugubris (Wilke, 1922)
 Stenomorpha lutulenta (Doyen, 1990)
 Stenomorpha macra (Horn, 1883)
 Stenomorpha magnifica (Pallister, 1954)
 Stenomorpha mancipata (Horn, 1878)
 Stenomorpha marginata LeConte, 1851
 Stenomorpha maritima (Casey, 1912)
 Stenomorpha mckittricki (Pierce, 1954)
 Stenomorpha montezuma Wilke, 1922
 Stenomorpha moricoides (Champion, 1892)
 Stenomorpha muricatula (LeConte, 1851)
 Stenomorpha musiva Wilke, 1922
 Stenomorpha neutralis (Casey, 1912)
 Stenomorpha nitidula (Casey, 1912)
 Stenomorpha obliterata (Champion, 1892)
 Stenomorpha oblonga (Casey, 1912)
 Stenomorpha obovata LeConte, 1851
 Stenomorpha obsidiana (Casey, 1912)
 Stenomorpha obsoleta (LeConte, 1851)
 Stenomorpha olsoni (Triplehorn & Flores, 2002)
 Stenomorpha opaca (Say, 1824)
 Stenomorpha oregonensis (Casey, 1924)
 Stenomorpha orizabae Wilke, 1922
 Stenomorpha palmeri (Champion, 1884)
 Stenomorpha papagoana (Casey, 1912)
 Stenomorpha parallela (LeConte, 1851)
 Stenomorpha pinalica (Casey, 1912)
 Stenomorpha planata (Horn, 1894)
 Stenomorpha polita (Say, 1824)
 Stenomorpha pollens (Casey, 1912)
 Stenomorpha procurrens (Casey, 1912)
 Stenomorpha pubescens (Champion, 1884)
 Stenomorpha puncticollis (LeConte, 1866)
 Stenomorpha quadricollis (Horn, 1880)
 Stenomorpha rimata (LeConte, 1854)
 Stenomorpha roosevelti Smith, Miller & Wheeler 2011
 Stenomorpha rudis (Casey, 1912)
 Stenomorpha rufipes (Champion, 1884)
 Stenomorpha rugata (Casey, 1912)
 Stenomorpha rugicollis (Triplehorn & Brown, 1971)
 Stenomorpha rustica (Casey, 1912)
 Stenomorpha satiata (Casey, 1912)
 Stenomorpha segregata (Champion, 1892)
 Stenomorpha semilaevis (Horn, 1870)
 Stenomorpha semirufa (Casey, 1912)
 Stenomorpha servilis (Casey, 1912)
 Stenomorpha severa (Casey, 1912)
 Stenomorpha socialis (Casey, 1912)
 Stenomorpha speculata (Blaisdell, 1936)
 Stenomorpha sphaericollis (Champion, 1884)
 Stenomorpha spinimanus (Champion, 1892)
 Stenomorpha sponsor (Casey, 1912)
 Stenomorpha spurcans (Casey, 1912)
 Stenomorpha strigosula (Casey, 1912)
 Stenomorpha suavis (Casey, 1912)
 Stenomorpha subcruenta (Casey, 1912)
 Stenomorpha subcylindrica (Horn, 1870)
 Stenomorpha subelegans (Casey, 1912)
 Stenomorpha subpilosa Solier, 1836
 Stenomorpha suturalis (Champion, 1884)
 Stenomorpha tarda (Champion, 1892)
 Stenomorpha tenebrosa (Champion, 1892)
 Stenomorpha tensa (Casey, 1912)
 Stenomorpha tenuicollis (Triplehorn, 1967)
 Stenomorpha tetrica (Casey, 1912)
 Stenomorpha thoracica (Champion, 1884)
 Stenomorpha tularensis (Casey, 1912)
 Stenomorpha tumidicollis Blaisdell, 1943
 Stenomorpha uhdei Wilke, 1922
 Stenomorpha umbrosa (Champion, 1884)
 Stenomorpha unicostata (Champion, 1892)
 Stenomorpha vigens (Casey, 1912)
 Stenomorpha villosa (Champion, 1884)
 Stenomorpha wickhami (Horn, 1894)
 Stenomorpha zacatecensis (Pallister, 1954)

References

Pimeliinae
Stenomorpha